Pikárec is a municipality and village in Žďár nad Sázavou District in the Vysočina Region of the Czech Republic. It has about 300 inhabitants.

Notable people
Josef Stehlík (1915–1991), fighter pilot

References

Villages in Žďár nad Sázavou District